Symbiezidium madagascariensis is a species of liverwort in the family Lejeuneaceae. It is found in Madagascar and Seychelles, where it grows on tree bark in rainforest habitat. It is threatened by declines in its native habitat type.

References

Lejeuneaceae
Endangered plants
Taxonomy articles created by Polbot